The 2013–14 NCAA Division I women's basketball season began in November and ended with the Final Four in Nashville, Tennessee April 6–8.

Milestones and records
December 16 – Stanford senior Chiney Ogwumike surpassed 2000 points and 1000 rebounds for her career. She eclipsed the scoring mark in a 32-point game against New Mexico. She became the fifth Cardinal women's player to reach the 2000/1000 milestone.
December 29 – Wake Forest senior Chelsea Douglas broke the school's single-game scoring record. Douglas scored 48 points in a win over Florida International. The previous record of 40 points was held by Brittany Waters and Liz Strunk.
 Middle Tennessee forward Ebony Rowe, Nebraska forward Jordan Hooper, Maryland forward Alyssa Thomas and Louisville guard Shoni Schimmel each passed the 2,000 point mark for their careers.
 January 25 - University of Tennessee (Chattanooga)'s Jim Foster reached the 800 victory milestone in a game against Samford.
 February 12 - Kelsey Minato (Army) hit 26 of 26 free throw attempts in a game against Holy Cross, the most ever in NCAA history.
 April 8 – Connecticut played in their 40th game of the season, tying Baylor for the most games played in a season.

Coaching wins milestones
 900 victories - Robin Selvig - University of Montana. November 19 versus Portland.
 900 victories - Tara VanDerveer - Stanford University. November 27 versus Florida Gulf Coast.
 800 victories - Jim Foster - Chattanooga. January 25 versus Florida Gulf Coast.
 700 victories - Cindy Russo - Florida International University. February 5 versus Colgate.
 500 victories - Kathy Delaney-Smith - Harvard University. November 23 versus Colgate.
 500 victories - Joanne McCallie - Duke University. December 8 versus Oklahoma.

Conference membership changes

The 2013–14 season saw the largest wave of membership changes resulting from a major realignment of NCAA Division I conferences. The cycle began in 2010 with the Big Ten and the then-Pac-10 publicly announcing their intentions to expand. The fallout from these conferences' moves later affected a majority of D-I conferences. The most significant developments this season were:
 The original Big East Conference split into football-sponsoring and non-football conferences. The non-football league now operates as the newly chartered Big East Conference, while the football-sponsoring league operates under the old charter as the renamed American Athletic Conference (The American).
 With The American adding four members in 2013 and three more in 2014, all from Conference USA (C-USA), the latter league responded by adding eight members in 2013, plus one more in 2014. Four of the 2013 C-USA arrivals came from the Sun Belt Conference, which itself added five schools (three in 2013 and two in 2014).
 The Western Athletic Conference saw near-total replacement of its membership. Only three schools that had been members in the 2012–13 season—Idaho, New Mexico State, and Seattle—remain in the WAC for 2013–14, and Idaho left for the Big Sky Conference after this season. The WAC's attempts to replenish its membership led to the demise of the Great West Conference.

In addition, four schools began the transition up from Division II starting this season. These schools were ineligible for NCAA-sponsored postseason play until completing their D-I transitions in 2017.

The 2013–14 season was also the last for several other teams in their current conferences:
 Four schools left the Southern Conference (SoCon). Appalachian State and Georgia Southern left for the Sun Belt, Davidson for the Atlantic 10, and Elon for the CAA.
 East Tennessee State and Mercer left the Atlantic Sun Conference for the SoCon. 
 East Carolina, Tulane, and Tulsa left C-USA for The American.
 As noted above, Idaho left the WAC and returned its non-football sports to the Big Sky Conference (after an 18-year absence).
 Louisville and Rutgers both spent only one season in The American; they respectively left for the ACC and Big Ten.
 Maryland left the ACC for the Big Ten.
 Oral Roberts left the Southland and returned to the Summit.
 Western Kentucky left the Sun Belt for C-USA.

New arenas
 The Nebraska Cornhuskers left their home since 1976, the on-campus Bob Devaney Sports Center, for the new Pinnacle Bank Arena in downtown Lincoln. 
 The Towson Tigers also left behind a venue that they had occupied since 1976, the Towson Center. Unlike Nebraska, Towson stayed on campus in the new Tiger Arena.
 The four Division I newcomers all chose to use existing on-campus venues:
 Abilene Christian – Moody Coliseum
 Grand Canyon – Grand Canyon University Arena
 Incarnate Word – McDermott Convocation Center
 UMass Lowell – The River Hawks' main basketball venue is Costello Athletic Center. Another on-campus venue, the Tsongas Center, normally home to the school's ice hockey team, is available for games requiring a larger capacity.

Major rule changes
 The 10-second rule in the backcourt, under which the offensive team must cross the midcourt line within 10 seconds of gaining possession in the backcourt, was introduced to the women's game for the first time. Previously, women's college basketball had been the only level of basketball in the world without a timed backcourt rule.
 If a team calls a timeout within the 30 seconds preceding a scheduled media timeout (the first dead ball after the 16-, 12-, 8-, and 4-minute marks), the called timeout will replace the scheduled media timeout. The only exception to this new rule is the first timeout called by either team in the second half. This change was made only in the women's game; it did not become part of the men's game until the 2015–16 season.
 Expanded the use of video review as follows:
 Shot-clock violations and who caused the ball to go out-of-bounds in the final 2:00 of regulation or overtime.
 Determine if a field goal is worth two points or three in the final 4:00 of regulation or in the entire overtime period. Any other such review must wait until the next media timeout (at that time, 16:00, 12:00 and 8:00 as well as the final 4:00 of the first half; since 2015–16, media timeouts take place at the 5:00 mark of each quarter).
 Change the block/charge rule to not permit a defender from sliding in front of an offensive player at the last second to draw a charge.  The defender must be in position when the offensive player begins his upward flight with the ball.
 Increasing emphasis on hand-checking or extended arms on defense. 
 Permit the use of video review to determine if an elbow delivered above the shoulders of an opponent warrants a flagrant-1 or -2 foul (as was previously the case), a player control foul, or no call.

Season outlook

Pre-season polls

The top 25 from the AP and USA Today Coaches Polls.

Conference winners and tournaments

Postseason tournaments

NCAA tournament

Final Four - Bridgestone Arena

Conference standings

References

 
2013–14 in American women's college basketball